Horowhenua was a New Zealand parliamentary electorate, from 1978 to 1996.

Population centres
The 1977 electoral redistribution was the most overtly political since the Representation Commission had been established through an amendment to the Representation Act in 1886, initiated by Muldoon's National Government. As part of the 1976 census, a large number of people failed to fill out an electoral re-registration card, and census staff had not been given the authority to insist on the card being completed. This had little practical effect for people on the general roll, but it transferred Māori to the general roll if the card was not handed in. Together with a northward shift of New Zealand's population, this resulted in five new electorates having to be created in the upper part of the North Island. The electoral redistribution was very disruptive, and 22 electorates were abolished, while 27 electorates were newly created (including Horowhenua) or re-established.

In the 1977 electoral redistribution, the  electorate moved south and the  electorate moved north. The Horowhenua electorate was established in between those electorates, covering the Horowhenua District, with the main towns Waikanae, Otaki, Shannon, and Foxton. In the 1983 electoral redistribution, Horowhenua's boundaries contracted and Shannon was lost to the Manawatu electorate. In the 1987 electoral redistribution, the Horowhenua electorate moved slightly north, and Waikanae was lost to Kapiti, whilst Shannon was regained.

The Horowhenua electorate was abolished for the 1996 election, the first mixed-member proportional (MMP) representation election. It was largely replaced by the Ōtaki electorate.

History
The electorate was established for the 1978 election. The first member was Geoff Thompson of the National Party, who was the representative for two parliamentary terms. When the Horowhenua electorate was abolished in 1996, Keall stood in the Otaki electorate, where she had a majority of under 1,000 votes.

Members of Parliament
Unless otherwise stated, all MPs terms began and ended at general elections.

Key

Election results

1993 election

1990 election

1987 election

1984 election

1981 election

1978 election

Notes

References

Historical electorates of New Zealand
Politics of Manawatū-Whanganui
1978 establishments in New Zealand
1996 disestablishments in New Zealand
Horowhenua District